Amandeep Drall is an Indian golfer.

Drall won the fourth leg of the 2020 Hero Women's Pro Golf Tour.

References

Year of birth missing (living people)
Living people
Indian female golfers
Place of birth missing (living people)
21st-century Indian women